Maynor is an unincorporated community in Raleigh County, West Virginia, United States. Its post office  is closed.

The community was named after a local family with the last name of "Maynor".

References

Unincorporated communities in West Virginia
Unincorporated communities in Raleigh County, West Virginia